The First Wave is a 2021 American documentary film, directed and produced by Matthew Heineman. The film follows a hospital in New York City, as it battles the COVID-19 pandemic. Alex Gibney serves as an executive producer.

It had its world premiere at the Hamptons Film Festival on October 7, 2021. It is scheduled to be released on November 19, 2021, by Neon.

Synopsis 
The film follows a hospital in New York City from March to June 2020, as it battles the COVID-19 pandemic. The film examines structural factors that influenced the initial COVID outbreak and how such factors impact American society more broadly.

Production 

In April 2020, it was announced Heineman would direct a documentary film revolving around the COVID-19 pandemic, focusing on health care workers with Alex Gibney set to serve as an executive producer.

Matthew Heineman reached out to a source from his previous film Escape Fire: The Fight to Rescue American Healthcare, to explore access opportunities at different medical facilities in New York, with Long Island Jewish Medical Center allowing Heineman and his crew to film. Donning the same personal protective equipment as hospital staff, two-person teams deployed to chronicle unfolding events. No crew members contracted the virus during production.

Release 
In March 2021, Neon and National Geographic Documentary Films acquired distribution rights to the film. It had its world premiere at the Hamptons International Film Festival on October 7, 2021. It also screened at the Busan International Film Festival and BFI London Film Festival on October 9, 2021. It will also screen at AFI Fest in November 2021. It is scheduled to be released in the United States on November 19, 2021. and in the United Kingdom on November 26, 2021, by Dogwoof.

Reception

Critical reception 
On the review aggregator website Rotten Tomatoes, the film holds an approval rating of 96% based on 27 reviews, with an average rating of 7.9/10. The website's consensus reads "The First Wave presents a starkly gripping snapshot of a crisis unfolding -- and its grim toll on those who put their lives on the line to fight it". On Metacritic, the film has a weighted average score of 85 out of 100, based on 11 critics, indicating "universal acclaim".

Accolades

References

External links 
 

2021 films
2021 documentary films
American documentary films
Neon (distributor) films
Participant (company) films
Documentary films about the COVID-19 pandemic
2020s English-language films
2020s American films
Films directed by Matthew Heineman